The Hawker Hurricane is a British single-seat fighter aircraft of the 1930s–40s which was designed and predominantly built by Hawker Aircraft Ltd. for service with the Royal Air Force (RAF). It was overshadowed in the public consciousness by the Supermarine Spitfire during the Battle of Britain in 1940, but the Hurricane inflicted 60% of the losses sustained by the Luftwaffe in the campaign, and fought in all the major theatres of the Second World War.

The Hurricane originated from discussions between RAF officials and aircraft designer Sir Sydney Camm about a proposed monoplane derivative of the Hawker Fury biplane in the early 1930s. Despite an institutional preference for biplanes and lack of interest by the Air Ministry, Hawker refined its monoplane proposal, incorporating several innovations which became critical to wartime fighter aircraft, including retractable landing gear and the more powerful Rolls-Royce Merlin engine. The Air Ministry ordered Hawker's Interceptor Monoplane in late 1934, and the prototype Hurricane K5083 performed its maiden flight on 6 November 1935.

The Hurricane went into production for the Air Ministry In June 1936 and entered squadron service in December 1937. Its manufacture and maintenance were eased by using conventional construction methods so that squadrons could perform many major repairs without external support. The plane was rapidly procured prior to the outbreak of the Second World War; in September 1939, the RAF had 18 Hurricane-equipped squadrons in service. It was relied upon to defend against German aircraft operated by the Luftwaffe, including dogfighting with Messerschmitt Bf 109s in multiple theatres of action.

The Hurricane was developed through several versions:  bomber-interceptors, fighter-bombers, and ground support aircraft as well as fighters. Versions designed for the Royal Navy known as the Sea Hurricane had modifications enabling operation from ships. Some were converted as catapult-launched convoy escorts. By the end of production in July 1944, 14,487 units had been completed in Britain and Canada, with others built in Belgium and Yugoslavia.

Development

Background
During the early 1930s, when Hawker Aircraft company developed the Hurricane, RAF Fighter Command had just 13 squadrons, equipped with the Hawker Fury, Hawker Demon, or the Bristol Bulldog, all biplanes with fixed-pitch wooden propellers and non-retractable undercarriages. At the time, there was an institutional reluctance towards change within the Air Staff; some senior figures were prejudiced against the adoption of monoplane fighter aircraft, while mid-level officers were typically more open-minded.

In 1934 the British Air Ministry issued Specification F.5/34 in response to demands within the Royal Air Force (RAF) for a new generation of fighter aircraft. Earlier, during 1933, British aircraft designer Sydney Camm had conducted discussions with Major John Buchanan of the Directorate of Technical Development on a monoplane based on the existing Fury. Mason attributes Camm's discussions with figures within the RAF, such as Squadron Leader Ralph Sorley, as having provoked the specification and some of its details, such as the preference for armaments being installed within the wings instead of within the aircraft's nose.

An outline of the "Fury Monoplane" armed with two guns in the wings and two in the nose and powered by the Goshawk engine was prepared and discussed with Roger Liptrot of the Air Ministry in December 1933. The design was reworked with the PV.12, following detailed work working drawings of the "Interceptor Monoplane" were begun in May 1934. The complete design was presented to the Air Ministry on 4 September.

Camm's initial submission in response to the earlier fighter specification F.7/30 was a  development of the Fury, the Hawker P.V.3,  However, the P.V.3 was not among the proposals which the Air Ministry selected to be built as prototype to official contract. After the rejection of the P.V.3 proposal, Camm started work on a new design involving a cantilever monoplane arrangement with a fixed undercarriage, armed with four machine guns and powered by the Rolls-Royce Goshawk engine. The original 1934 armament specifications for what evolved into the Hurricane were for a similar armament fitment to the Gloster Gladiator: four machine guns; two in the wings and two in the fuselage, synchronised to fire through the propeller arc. By January 1934, the proposal's detail drawings had been finished, but these failed to impress the Air Ministry enough for a prototype to be ordered.

Camm's response to this rejection was to further develop the design, introducing a retractable undercarriage and replacing the unsatisfactory Goshawk engine with a new Rolls-Royce design, initially designated the PV-12, which went on to become famous as the Merlin. In August 1934, a one-tenth scale model of the design was produced and sent to the National Physical Laboratory at Teddington, where a series of wind tunnel tests confirmed the aerodynamics were satisfactory, and in September 1934 Camm again approached the Air Ministry. This time, the Ministry's response was favourable, and a prototype of the "Interceptor Monoplane" was promptly ordered.

In July 1934, at a meeting chaired by Air Commodore Arthur Tedder (director of training), the Air Ministry Science Officer Captain F.W. "Gunner" Hill presented his calculation showing that future fighters must carry no fewer than eight machine guns, each capable of firing 1,000 rounds per  minute./ Hill's assistant in making his calculations was his 13-year-old daughter Hazel Hill. Of the decision to place eight machine guns in fighters, Claude Hilton Keith, at the time assistant director of armament research and development, said "The battle was brisk and was carried into very high quarters before the implementing authority was given. My Branch had made out a sound case for 8-gun fighters and if this recommendation had not been accepted and we had been content with half-measures, it might indeed have gone ill for us during the late summer of 1940". Present at the meeting was Squadron Leader Ralph Sorley of the Air Ministry's Operational Requirements branch, who played an important role in the decision. In November 1934, the Air Ministry issued Specification F.5/34 which called for new fighter aircraft to be armed with a total of eight guns. However, by this time, work had progressed too far to immediately modify the planned four-gun installation. By January 1935, a wooden mock-up had been finished, and although a number of suggestions for detail changes were made, construction of the prototype was approved, and a new specification (F.36/34) was written around the design. In July 1935, this specification was amended to include installation of eight guns.

The mock-up conference with Air Ministry staff was on 10 January 1935 at Kingston. The ministry order to purchase a prototype to the September proposal was placed on 21 February 1935. At the time the armament was two Vickers Mark V machine guns in the fuselage and one Browning machine gun in each wing. Work on stressed skin outer wings to replace the fabric covered ones began in July and the contract was altered in August to include another set of wings with eight guns in them; the guns were to be either Vickers or Brownings. These wings were delivered in June 1936.

Prototype and trials

By the end of August 1935, work on the airframe had been completed at Hawker's Kingston upon Thames facility and the aircraft components were transported to Brooklands, Surrey, where Hawker had an assembly shed; the prototype was fully re-assembled on 23 October 1935,. Ground testing and taxi trials took place over the following two weeks. On 6 November 1935 the prototype K5083 took to the air for the first time at the hands of Hawker's chief test pilot, Flight Lieutenant George Bulman. Bulman was assisted by two other pilots in subsequent flight testing; Philip Lucas flew some of the experimental test flights, while John Hindmarsh conducted the firm's production flight trials. As completed, the prototype had been fitted with ballast to represent the aircraft's armament prior to the acceptance of the final multi-gun wing armament.

By March 1936 the prototype had completed ten flying hours, covering all major portions of the flight envelope. Early testing had gone reasonably well, especially in light of the trial status of the Merlin engine, which had yet to achieve full flight certification at this time and thus severe restrictions had been imposed upon use of the engine. In early 1936, the prototype was transferred to RAF Martlesham Heath, Suffolk, to participate in initial service trials under the direction of Squadron Leader D.F. Anderson. Sammy Wroath, later to be the founding commandant of the Empire Test Pilots' School, was the RAF test pilot for the Hurricane: his report was favourable, stating that: "The aircraft is simple and easy to fly and has no apparent vices" and proceeded to praise its control response.

In the course of RAF trials, despite the problems with the Merlin engine, which had suffered numerous failures and necessitating several changes, enthusiastic reports were produced on the aircraft and its performance.

In the course of further testing, it was found that the Hurricane had poor spin recovery characteristics, in which all rudder authority could be lost due to shielding of the rudder. Hawker's response to the issue was to request that spinning tests be waived, but the Air Ministry refused the request; the situation was resolved by the Royal Aircraft Establishment (RAE), who established that the aerodynamic problem had been caused by a breakdown of the airflow over the lower fuselage, and could be cured by the addition of a small ventral fairing and extension of the bottom of the rudder. This discovery had come too late for the changes to be incorporated in the first production aircraft, but were introduced upon the 61st built and all subsequent aircraft.

In early 1936, the Hawker board of directors had decided, in the absence of official authorisation and at company expense, to proceed with the issue of the design drawings to the production design office and to start tooling-up for a production line capable of producing a batch of 1,000 Hurricanes.

Production

In June 1936 the Air Ministry placed its first order, for 600 aircraft. On 26 June 1936, the type name "Hurricane", which had been proposed by Hawker, was approved by the Air Ministry; an informal christening ceremony for the aircraft was carried out the following month during an official visit by King Edward VIII to Martlesham Heath.

A major reason for the aircraft's appeal was its relatively simple construction and ease of manufacture. It was significantly cheaper than Supermarine Spitfire and took 10,300 man hours to produce each example, compared to 15,200 for the Spitfire. As a large-scale war was looking increasingly likely, and time was of the essence in providing the RAF with an effective fighter aircraft, it was unclear if the more advanced Spitfire would enter production smoothly, while the Hurricane made use of well-understood manufacturing techniques. This factor was equally applicable for its use within service squadrons, which were experienced in working on and repairing aircraft whose construction was similar to the Hurricane, and the simplicity of its design enabled the improvisation of some remarkable repairs in squadron workshops. A fabric-covered wing, patterned upon traditional Hawker designs, was initially adopted in order to speed up production; a higher-performing stressed-skin metal wing took its place in late 1939.

On 12 October 1937, the maiden flight of the first production Hurricane I which was powered by a Merlin II engine took place, flown by Flight Lieutenant Philip Lucas. While a production contract for 600 Hurricanes was received on 2 June 1936, deliveries were delayed by roughly six months due to the decision made in December 1936 to equip the Hurricane with the improved Merlin II, replacing the troubled Merlin I. The effect of this was that "the cowling shape and fairing lines were considerably altered" and "other units affected were the air intake, airscrew, engine controls, engine mounting, hand starter gear, header tank and header tank mounting."

Merlin I production was terminated after 180 were built.  The earlier engine had been prioritised for the Fairey Battle light bomber and the Hawker Henley, a failed competitor to the Battle adapted as a target tug which shared common elements with the Hurricane design. By the following December, the first four aircraft to enter service with the RAF had joined No. 111 Squadron, stationed at RAF Northolt. By February 1938, No. 111 Squadron had received 16 Hurricanes. Upon the outbreak of the Second World War, over 550 Hurricanes had been produced, which had equipped a total of 18 squadrons, while a further 3,500 aircraft were on order.

During 1940, Lord Beaverbrook, who was the Minister of Aircraft Production, established an organisation in which a number of manufacturers were seconded to repair and overhaul battle-damaged aircraft including Hurricanes. The Civilian Repair Organisation also overhauled battle-weary aircraft, which were later sent to training units or to other air forces; one of the factories involved was the Austin Aero Company's Cofton Hackett plant. Another was David Rosenfield Ltd, based at Barton aerodrome near Manchester.

A major manufacturer of the Hurricane was Canadian Car and Foundry at their factory in Fort William, Ontario, Canada, receiving its initial contract for 40 Hurricanes in November 1938. The facility's chief engineer, Elsie MacGill, became known as the "Queen of the Hurricanes". The initiative was commercially led rather than governmentally, but was endorsed by the British government; Hawker, having recognised that a major conflict was all but inevitable after the Munich Crisis of 1938, drew up preliminary plans to expand Hurricane production via a new factory in Canada. Under this plan, samples, pattern aircraft, and a complete set of design documents stored on microfilm, were shipped to Canada; in 1938/9 the RCAF ordered 24 Hurricanes to equip one fighter squadron, 20 of which were delivered, and two more were supplied to Canadian Car and Foundry as pattern aircraft but one probably did not arrive, while the other was sent back to Britain in 1940. The first Hurricane built at Canadian Car and Foundry was officially produced in February 1940. As a result, Canadian-built Hurricanes were shipped to Britain to participate in events such as the Battle of Britain.

Overall, some 14,487 Hurricanes and Sea Hurricanes were produced in England and Canada. The majority of Hurricanes, 9,986 were built by Hawker (who produced the type at Brooklands from December 1937 to October 1942 and Langley from October 1939 to July 1944), while Hawker's sister company, the Gloster Aircraft Company, constructed 2,750. The Austin Aero Company completed 300 Hurricanes. Canada Car and Foundry was responsible for the production of 1,451 Hurricanes.  However those shipped to Britain were incomplete airframes, to be completed after arrival, about 80% arrived without an engine.

In 1939, production of 100 Hurricanes was initiated in Yugoslavia by Zmaj and Rogožarski. Of these, 20 were built by Zmaj by April 1941. Recognising that the supply of British-made Merlin engines might not be guaranteed, it was decided to fit one of the Yugoslavian Hurricanes with a Daimler-Benz DB 601 engine instead; this aircraft was test flown in 1941. In 1938, a contract for 80 Hurricanes was placed with Fairey's Belgian subsidiary Avions Fairey SA for the Belgian Air Force; it was intended to arm these aircraft with an arrangement of four  Browning machine guns. Three were built and two flown with this armament by the time of the German invasion of Belgium in May 1940, with at least 12 more constructed by Avions Fairey armed with the conventional eight rifle calibre machine gun armament.

Design

The Hawker Hurricane is a low-wing cantilever monoplane  with retractable undercarriage and an enclosed cockpit. The primary structure of the fuselage was a Warren truss box-girder with high-tensile steel longerons and duralumin cross-bracing, which were mechanically fastened rather than being welded. Over this, a secondary structure composed of wooden formers and stringers covered with doped linen gave the fuselage a rounded section. The majority of the external surfaces were linen, except for a section between the cockpit and the engine cowling which used lightweight metal panels instead. Camm had decided to use traditional Hawker construction techniques instead of more advanced options, such as a stressed-skin metal construction.  This form of construction resembled that of earlier biplanes and was already considered to be somewhat outdated when the Hurricane was introduced to service .  The Hurricane was initially armed with an arrangement of eight remotely-operated wing-mounted Browning machine guns, intended for conducting rapid engagements. The Hurricane was typically equipped for flying under both day and night conditions, being provided with navigation lights, Harley landing lights, complete blind-flying equipment, and two-way radios. Upon its entry to service, much of the performance data was intentionally concealed from the general public, but it was known that the type possessed a speed range of 6:1. A simple steel tube structure supported the engine; detachable cowling panels allowed access to most of the engine's areas for maintenance. Installed underneath the fuselage, the liquid-cooled radiator has a rectangular opening to its aft; this is covered by a hinged flap, allowing the pilot to control the cooling level. An atypical feature for the era was the use of Tungum alloy pipes throughout the cooling system.

Initially, the structure of the Hurricane's cantilever wing consisted of two steel spars, which possessed considerable strength and stiffness. The wing was described by  Flight as  relatively straightforward to manufacture, employing simple vertical jigs to attach the two spars, after which the wing ribs were installed using horizontal bolts, forming separate units between the front and rear spars. Hydraulically-actuated split trailing edge flaps were fitted to the inner end of the wings. This wing was predominantly fabric-covered, like the fuselage, although some lightweight metal sheets were used on the inner wing and its leading edge. The majority of the flight control surfaces, such as the Frise-type ailerons, also had fabric coverings.

An all-metal, stressed-skin wing of duraluminium (a DERD specification similar to AA2024) was introduced in April 1939 and was used for all of the later marks. "The metal skinned wings allowed a diving speed that was  higher than the fabric-covered ones. They were very different in construction but were interchangeable with the fabric-covered wings; one trials Hurricane, L1877, was even flown with a fabric-covered port wing and metal-covered starboard wing. The great advantage of the metal-covered wings over the fabric ones was that the metal ones could carry far greater stress loads without needing as much structure." Several fabric-wing Hurricanes were still in service during the Battle of Britain, although a good number had had their wings replaced during servicing or after repair. Changing the wings required only three hours work per aircraft.

The Hurricane had a inward-retracting undercarriage, the main undercarriage units being housed in recesses in the wing. Hinged telescopic Vickers-built legs are attached to the bottom boom of the wing's forward spar, but with a angled pivot  to allow the strut to be perpendicular to the thrust line when extended and angle rearwards when retracted to clear the forward spar. A hydraulic jack actuated the undercarriage. Two separate hydraulic systems, one being power-operated and the other hand-operated, are present for the deployment and retraction of the undercarriage; in the event of both failing, pilots can release the retaining catches holding the undercarriage in place, deploying the wheels to the 'down' position using weight alone. A wide wheel-track was used to allow for considerable stability during ground movements and to enable tight turns to be performed.

The prototype and early production Hurricanes were fitted with a Watts two-bladed fixed-pitch wooden propeller. Flight commented of this arrangement: "Many have expressed surprise that the Hurricane is not fitted with variable-pitch airscrews". The original two-bladed propeller was found to be inefficient at low airspeeds and the aircraft required a long ground run to get airborne, which caused concern at Fighter Command. Deliveries of these began in April 1939: this was later replaced by the hydraulically operated constant-speed Rotol propeller, which came into service in time for the Battle of Britain.

Camm's priority was to provide the pilot with good all-round visibility. To this end, the cockpit was mounted reasonably high in the fuselage, creating a distinctive "hump-backed" silhouette. Pilot access to the cockpit was aided by a retractable "stirrup" mounted below the trailing edge of the port wing. This was linked to a spring-loaded hinged flap which covered a handhold on the fuselage, just behind the cockpit. When the flap was shut, the footstep retracted into the fuselage. In addition, both wing roots were coated with strips of non-slip material.

An advantage of the steel-tube structure was that cannon shells could pass right through the wood and fabric covering without exploding. Even if one of the steel tubes were damaged, the repair work required was relatively simple and could be done by ground crew at the airfield. Damage to a stressed skin structure, as used by the Spitfire, required more specialised equipment to repair. The old-fashioned structure also permitted the assembly of Hurricanes with relatively basic equipment under field conditions. Crated Hurricanes were assembled at Takoradi in West Africa and flown across the Sahara to the Middle East theatre and, to save space, some Royal Navy aircraft carriers carried their reserve Sea Hurricanes dismantled into their major assemblies, which were slung up on the hangar bulkheads and deckhead for reassembly when needed.

In contrast, the contemporary Spitfire used all-metal monocoque construction and was thus both lighter and stronger, though less tolerant of bullet damage. With its ease of maintenance, widely set landing gear and benign flying characteristics, the Hurricane remained in use in theatres of operations where reliability, easy handling and a stable gun platform were more important than performance, typically in roles like ground attack. One of the design requirements of the original specification was that both the Hurricane and the Spitfire were also to be used as night fighters. The Hurricane proved to be a relatively simple aircraft to fly at night, and shot down several German aircraft on night raids. From early 1941 the Hurricane was also used as an "intruder" aircraft, patrolling German airfields in France at night to catch bombers taking off or landing.

Operational history

Pre-war

By the middle of 1938, the first 50 Hurricanes had reached squadrons and, at that time, it had been assessed that the rate of production was slightly greater than the RAF's capacity to introduce the new aircraft, which had already been accelerated. Accordingly, the British government gave Hawker the clearance to sell excess aircraft to nations that were likely to oppose German expansion. As a result, there were some modest export sales made to other countries; at the earliest opportunity, a former RAF Hurricane I was dispatched to Yugoslavia for evaluation purposes. Shortly after this evaluation, an order for 24 Hurricane Mk.Is for the Royal Yugoslav Air Force was received; this was followed by the purchase of a production licence for the Hurricane by Yugoslavia. Yugoslavian Hurricanes saw action against the Luftwaffe during the invasion of Yugoslavia in 1941 by the Axis powers.

To the end of August 1939, 14 Hurricanes had been sent to Poland (SS Lassel left Liverpool on 30 August 1939 heading to Constanza in Romania, these planes never reached Poland and ultimately were sold to Turkey), seven ex-RAF Hurricanes had been sent to South Africa, while another 13 ex-RAF Hurricanes were sent to Turkey, 13 Hurricanes had been built for Belgium, 21 for Canada including one as a pattern for Canadian Car and Foundry, one for Iran, one for Poland, three for Romania and 12 for Yugoslavia. All the built for export aircraft were taken from the RAF order and so all originally had an RAF serial. Further exports were done in the final four months of 1939 and early 1940.

Hurricane production was increased as part of a plan to create a reserve of attrition aircraft as well as re-equip existing squadrons and newly formed ones such as those of the Auxiliary Air Force. Expansion scheme E included a target of 500 fighters of all types by the start of 1938. By the time of the Munich Crisis, there were only two fully operational RAF squadrons of the planned 12 to be equipped with Hurricanes. By the time of the German invasion of Poland there were 16 operational Hurricane squadrons as well as a further two more that were in the process of converting.

Phoney War

Owing to the Hurricane's rugged construction, ease of maintenance and repair in the field, and its docile landing and take-off characteristics, coupled with a wide-track undercarriage, it was selected to go to France as the principal RAF fighter. Two Hurricane squadrons, No. 1 and No. 73, formed 67 Wing of the Advanced Air Striking Force, while two more, No. 85 and No. 87, formed 60 Wing of the Air Component, BEF.

While the two squadrons of No. 60 Wing had their Hurricanes painted in the standard colour scheme and markings of Home-based fighters, those of No. 67 Wing differed considerably. It was probably because No. 1 and No. 73 Squadrons were operating in close proximity to French fighter squadrons that these units painted red, white and blue stripes over the entire height of the rudders on their Hurricanes in a similar manner to the standard French AF National markings.

As the French squadrons were not familiar with the [British] use of code letters, and there could have been cause for error in aircraft identification, both Hurricane squadrons removed their squadron identification letters, leaving the grey-painted aircraft letter aft of the [fuselage] roundel. The decision to adopt these special changes in markings seems to have been made at 67 Group HQ (the immediate command authority for the two squadrons involved) to suit local circumstances.

On 24 August 1939, the British government gave orders partially to mobilise and No. 1 Group RAF (Air Vice-Marshal Patrick Playfair) sent its 10 Fairey Battle day-bomber squadrons to France, according to plans established by the British and French earlier in the year. The group was the first echelon of the RAF Advanced Air Striking Force (AASF) and flew from bases at Abingdon, Harwell, Benson, Boscombe Down and Bicester. The group HQ became the AASF when the order to move to France was received and the home station HQs, 71, 72 74–76 Wings. As part of the AASF, No. 1 and No. 73 Squadrons Fighter Command operating Hawker Hurricanes were also sent to France (No. 1 to Berry-au-Bac, north-west of Paris; No. 73 to Rouvres) and assigned escort duties independent of the Air Component BEF.

The Hurricane had its first combat action on 21 October 1939, at the start of the Phoney War. That day, "A" Flight of 46 Squadron took off from North Coates satellite airfield, on the Lincolnshire coast, and was directed to intercept a formation of nine Heinkel He 115B floatplanes from 1/KüFlGr 906, searching for ships to attack in the North Sea. The Heinkels, which were flying at sea level in an attempt to avoid fighter attacks, had already been attacked and damaged by two Spitfires from 72 Squadron when six Hurricanes intercepted them. The Hurricanes shot down four of the enemy in rapid succession, 46 Squadron claiming five and the Spitfire pilots two.

In response to a request from the French government for the provision of 10 fighter squadrons to provide air support, Air Chief Marshal Sir Hugh Dowding, Commander-in-Chief of RAF Fighter Command, insisted that this number would deplete British defences severely, and so initially only four squadrons of Hurricanes, 1, 73, 85 and 87, were relocated to France, keeping Spitfires back for "Home" defence. The first to arrive was 73 Squadron on 10 September 1939, followed shortly by the other three. A little later, 607 and 615 Squadrons joined them.

After his first flight in October 1939, Hurricane pilot Roland Beamont subsequently flew operationally with 87 Squadron, claiming three enemy aircraft during the French campaign, and delivered great praise for his aircraft's performance:

While the opening months of the war were characterised by little air activity in general, there were sporadic engagements and aerial skirmishes between the two sides. On 30 October 1939 Hurricanes saw action over France. That day, Pilot Officer P. W. O. "Boy" Mould of 1 Squadron, flying Hurricane L1842, shot down a Dornier Do 17P from 2(F)/123. Mould was the first RAF pilot to down an enemy aircraft on the European continent in the Second World War. According to Mason, the experiences gained in these early engagements proved invaluable in developing tactics which became tried and tested, and rapidly spread throughout Fighter Command.

On 6 November 1939, Pilot Officer Peter Ayerst from 73 Squadron was the first to clash with a Messerschmitt Bf 109. After the dogfight, he came back with five holes in his fuselage. Flying Officer Cobber Kain, a New Zealander, was responsible for 73 Squadron's first victory, on 8 November 1939 while stationed at Rouvres. He went on to become one of the RAF's first fighter aces of the war, being credited with 16 kills. On 22 December, the Hurricanes in France suffered their first losses: three, while trying to intercept an unidentified aircraft between Metz and Thionville, were jumped by four Bf 109Es from III./JG 53, with their Gruppenkommandeur, Spanish Civil War ace Captain Werner Mölders, in the lead. Mölders and Leutnant Hans von Hahn shot down the Hurricanes of Sergeant R. M. Perry and J. Winn for no loss.

Battle of France

In May 1940, Nos. 3, 79 and 504 Squadrons reinforced the earlier units as Germany's Blitzkrieg gathered momentum. On 10 May, the first day of the Battle of France, Flight Lieutenant R. E. Lovett and Flying Officer "Fanny" Orton, of 73 Squadron, were the first RAF pilots to engage enemy aircraft in the campaign. They attacked one of three Dornier Do 17s from 4. Staffel/KG 2 that were flying over their airfield at Rouvres-en-Woevre. The Dornier went away unscathed, while Orton was hit by defensive fire and had to force land. On the same day the Hurricane squadrons claimed 42 German aircraft, none of them fighters, shot down during 208 sorties; seven Hurricanes were lost but no pilots were killed.

On 12 May several Hurricanes units were committed to escort bombers. That morning, five Fairey Battle volunteer crews from 12 Squadron took off from Amifontaine base to bomb Vroenhoven and Veldwezelt bridges on the Meuse, at Maastricht. The escort consisted of eight Hurricanes of 1 Squadron, with Squadron Leader P. J. H. "Bull" Halahan in the lead. When the formation approached Maastricht, it was bounced by 16 Bf 109Es from 2./JG 27. Two Battles and two Hurricanes (including Halahan's) were shot down, two more Battles were brought down by flak and the fifth bomber had to crash-land. The 1 Squadron pilots claimed four Messerschmitts and two Heinkel He 112s, while the Luftwaffe actually lost only one Bf 109.

On 13 May 1940, a further 32 Hurricanes arrived. All 10 requested Hurricane squadrons were then operating from French soil and felt the full force of the Nazi offensive. The following day, Hurricanes suffered heavy losses: 27 being shot down, 22 by Messerschmitts, with 15 pilots killed (another died some days later), including Squadron Leader J. B. Parnall (504 Squadron), and the Australian ace Flying Officer Les Clisby (1 Squadron). On the same day, 3 Squadron claimed 17 German aircraft shot down, 85 and 87 Squadrons together claimed four victories, while 607 Squadron claimed nine. During the following three days (15–17 May), no fewer than 51 Hurricanes were lost, in combat or in accidents.

By 17 May, the end of the first week of fighting, only three of the squadrons were near operational strength, but the Hurricanes had managed to destroy nearly twice as many German aircraft. On 18 May 1940, air combat continued from dawn to dusk; Hurricane pilots claimed 57 German aircraft and 20 probables (Luftwaffe records show 39 aircraft lost). The following day, 1 and 73 Squadrons claimed 11 German aircraft (three by "Cobber" Kain and three by Paul Richey). On these two days Hurricanes suffered heavier losses, with 68 Hurricanes shot down or forced to crash-land due to combat damage. Fifteen pilots were killed, eight were taken prisoner and 11 injured. Two-thirds of the Hurricanes had been shot down by Messerschmitt Bf 109s and Bf 110s.

In the afternoon of 20 May 1940, the Hurricane units based in northern France were ordered to abandon their bases on the continent and return to Great Britain. On the same day, "Bull" Halahan requested the repatriation of the pilots serving in 1 Squadron. During the previous 10 days, the unit had been the most successful of the campaign; it had claimed 63 victories for the loss of five pilots: two killed, one taken prisoner and two hospitalised. 1 Squadron was awarded 10 DFCs and three DFMs during the Blitzkrieg. On the evening of 21 May, the only Hurricanes still operational were those of the AASF that had been moved to bases around Troyes.

During the 11 days of fighting in France and over Dunkirk from 10 to 21 May, Hurricane pilots claimed 499 kills and 123 probables. Contemporary German records, examined postwar, attribute 299 Luftwaffe aircraft destroyed and 65 seriously damaged by RAF fighters. The last 66 Hurricanes of the 452 engaged during the Battle of France left France on 21 June; 178 were abandoned at several airfields, notably Merville, Abbeville, and Lille/Seclin.

Operation Dynamo
During Operation Dynamo (the evacuation from Dunkirk of British, French and Belgian troops cut off by the German army during the Battle of Dunkirk), the Hawker Hurricanes operated from British bases. Between 26 May and 3 June 1940, the 14 Hurricane units involved were credited with 108 air victories. A total of 27 Hurricane pilots became aces during Operation Dynamo, led by Canadian Pilot Officer W. L. Willie McKnight (10 victories) and Pilot Officer Percival Stanley Turner (seven victories), who served in No. 242 Squadron, consisting mostly of Canadian personnel. Losses were 22 pilots killed and three captured.

On 27 May 1940, in one of the final mass encounters of the Blitzkrieg, 13 Hurricanes from 501 Squadron intercepted 24 Heinkel He 111s escorted by 20 Bf 110s; during the ensuing battle, 11 Heinkels were claimed as "kills" and others damaged, with little damage to the Hurricanes. On 7 June 1940, "Cobber" Kain, the first RAF ace of the war, got word that he was to return to England for "rest leave" at an Operational Training Unit. On leaving his airfield, he put on an impromptu aerobatic display and was killed when his Hurricane crashed after completing a loop and attempting some low altitude "flick" rolls.

Initial engagements with the Luftwaffe had showed the Hurricane to be a tight-turning and steady platform, but the Watts two-bladed propeller was clearly unsuitable. At least one pilot complained of how a Heinkel 111 was able to pull away from him in a chase, yet by this time the Heinkel was obsolete. At the start of the war, the engine ran on standard 87 octane aviation spirit. From early 1940, increasing quantities of 100 octane fuel imported from the U.S. became available. In February 1940, Hurricanes with the Merlin II and III engines began to receive modifications to allow for an additional  of supercharger boost for five minutes (although there are accounts of its use for 30 minutes continuously).

"Overboost" or "pulling the plug", a form of war emergency power as it was called in later Second World War aircraft, was an important wartime modification that allowed the Hurricane to be more competitive against the Bf 109E and to increase its margin of superiority over the Bf 110C, especially at low altitude.

Flight Lieutenant Ian Gleed of 87 Squadron wrote about the effect of using the extra boost on the Hurricane while chasing a Bf 109 at low altitude on 19 May 1940: "Damn! We're flat out as it is. Here goes with the tit. A jerk – boost's shot up to 12 pounds; speed's increased by 30 mph. I'm gaining ground – 700, 600, 500 yards. Give him a burst. No, hold your fire you fool! He hasn't seen you yet..."

Hurricanes equipped with Rotol constant-speed propellers were delivered to RAF squadrons in May 1940, with deliveries continuing throughout the Battle of Britain. According to aviation author David Donald, the Rotol propeller had the effect of transforming the Hurricane's performance from "disappointing" to "acceptable mediocrity"; modified aircraft were reportedly much sought after among squadrons which had also been equipped with Hurricanes that were fitted with the older de Havilland two-position propeller.

Battle of Britain

At the end of June 1940, following the fall of France, 31 of Fighter Command's 61 fighter squadrons were equipped with Hurricanes. The Battle of Britain officially lasted from 10 July until 31 October 1940, but the heaviest fighting took place between 8 August and 21 September. Both the Supermarine Spitfire and the Hurricane are renowned for their part in having defended Britain against the Luftwaffe; generally, the Spitfires intercepted the German fighters, leaving Hurricanes to concentrate on the bombers, and, despite the undoubted abilities of the "thoroughbred" Spitfire, it was the "workhorse" Hurricane that scored the higher number of RAF victories during this period, accounting for 55% of the 2,739 German losses, according to Fighter Command, compared with 42% by Spitfires. On 8 August 1940, Hurricanes of No. 145 Squadron were recorded as having fired the first shots of the Battle of Britain. The highest scoring Hurricane squadron during the Battle of Britain was the No. 303 Polish Fighter Squadron. This squadron also had the distinction of having the highest ratio of enemy aircraft destroyed to own losses suffered.

As a fighter, the Hurricane had some drawbacks. It was slightly slower than both the Spitfire I and II and the Messerschmitt Bf 109E, and the thicker wing profiles compromised acceleration; but it could out-turn both of them. In spite of its performance deficiencies against the Bf 109, the Hurricane was still capable of destroying the German fighter, especially at lower altitudes. The standard tactic of the 109s was to attempt to climb higher than the RAF fighters and "bounce" them in a dive; the Hurricanes could evade such tactics by turning into the attack or going into a "corkscrew dive", which the 109s, with their lower rate of roll, found hard to counter. If a 109 was caught in a dogfight, the Hurricane was just as capable of out-turning the 109 as the Spitfire. In a stern chase, the 109 could evade the Hurricane.

In September 1940, the more powerful Mk.IIa series 1 Hurricanes started entering service, although only in small numbers. The Hurricane was a steady gun platform and had demonstrated its ruggedness as several were badly damaged yet returned to base. The Hurricane's construction made it dangerous if it caught fire; the wood frames and fabric covering of the rear fuselage allowed fire to spread through the rear fuselage structure easily. The gravity fuel tank in the forward fuselage sat right in front of the instrument panel, without any form of protection for the pilot. Many Hurricane pilots were seriously burned as a consequence of a jet of flame which could burn through the instrument panel. This became of such concern to Hugh Dowding that he had Hawker retrofit the fuselage tanks of the Hurricanes with Linatex, a self-expanding rubber coating. If the tank happened to be punctured by a bullet, the Linatex coating expanded when soaked with petrol and sealed it. However, some Hurricane pilots felt that the fuel tanks in the wings, although they were also protected with a layer of Linatex, were vulnerable from behind, and it was thought that those, and not the fuselage tank, were the main fire risk.

From 10 July to 11 August 1940, RAF fighters fired at 114 German bombers and shot down 80, a destruction ratio of 70%. Against the Bf 109, the RAF fighters attacked 70 and shot down 54 of these, a ratio of 77%. It has been suggested that part of the success of the British fighters was possibly due to the use of the de Wilde incendiary round. The Hurricane with the highest number of kills during the Battle of Britain was P3308, a Mk.I, flown between 15 August and 7 October 1940 by RAF (auxiliary) pilot Archie McKellar of 605 Squadron. He is credited with 21 kills, 19 of those in a Hurricane during the Battle of Britain. On 7 October he is credited with shooting down five Bf 109s, making him one of only two RAF pilots (the other being Brian Carbury of New Zealand) to become an "ace in a day" during the Battle of Britain. During his brief fighting career, McKellar earned the DSO, DFC & Bar. McKellar has remained in relative obscurity in Battle of Britain history, as he was killed in action one day after the date set by the War Ministry (after the war) as the official end date for the Battle of Britain. He died on 1 November 1940 while taking on a superior number of Bf 109s. As in the Spitfire, the Merlin engine suffered from negative-G cut-out, a problem not cured until the introduction of Miss Shilling's orifice in early 1941.

The only Battle of Britain Victoria Cross, and the only one awarded to a member of Fighter Command during the war, was awarded to Flight Lieutenant James Brindley Nicolson of 249 Squadron as a result of an action on 16 August 1940 when his section of three Hurricanes was "bounced" from above by Bf 110 fighters. All three were hit simultaneously. Nicolson was badly wounded, and his Hurricane was damaged and engulfed in flames. While attempting to leave the cockpit, Nicolson noticed that one of the Bf 110s had overshot his aircraft. He returned to the cockpit, which by now was in an inferno, engaged the enemy, and may have shot down the Bf 110. Afterward, he parachuted to safety, although he was mistakenly shot at by the Home Guard after landing.

Night fighters and intruders

Following the Battle of Britain the Hurricane continued to give service; through the Blitz of 1941 it was the principal single-seat night fighter in Fighter Command. F/Lt. Richard Stevens claimed 14 Luftwaffe bombers flying Hurricanes in 1941. In 1942 the cannon-armed Mk.IIc performed further afield, as a night intruder over occupied Europe. F/Lt. Karel Kuttelwascher of 1 Squadron proved the top scorer, with 15 Luftwaffe bombers claimed shot down. The year 1942 also saw the manufacture of 12 Hurricane II C(NF) night fighters, equipped with pilot-operated air interception Mark VI radar. After a brief operational deployment with No. 245 and No. 247 Squadron RAF during which these aircraft proved too slow for operations in Europe, the aircraft were sent to India to serve with No. 176 Squadron RAF in the defence of Calcutta. They were withdrawn from service at the end of December 1943.

North Africa

A Hurricane Mk.I undertook tropical trials in Sudan in mid 1939, and a number were hastily tropicalised following Italy's entry into the war in June 1940. These aircraft were initially ferried through France and Malta by air to 80 Squadron in Egypt, replacing Gladiator biplanes. The Hurricane claimed its first kill in the Mediterranean on 19 June 1940, when F/O P.G. Wykeham-Barnes reported shooting down two Fiat CR.42 Falcos.

Hurricanes served with several British Commonwealth squadrons in the Desert Air Force. They suffered heavy losses over North Africa after the arrival of Bf 109E and F-variants and were progressively replaced in the air superiority role from June 1941 by Curtiss Tomahawks/Kittyhawks. However, fighter-bomber variants ("Hurribombers") retained an edge in the ground attack role, due to their impressive armament of four   cannon and a  bomb load.

From November 1941, beginning in the Libyan desert, it had to face a new formidable opponent: the new Regia Aeronautica Macchi C.202 Folgore. The Italian aircraft proved superior to the Hawker fighter and, thanks to its excellent agility and a new, more powerful inline engine licence-built by Alfa Romeo, could outperform it in a dogfight.

During and following the five-day Second Battle of El Alamein artillery barrage that commenced on the night of 23 October 1942, six squadrons of Hurricanes, including the  cannon-armed Hurricane Mk.IID version, claimed to have destroyed 39 tanks, 212 lorries and armoured troop-carriers, 26 bowsers, 42 guns, 200 various other vehicles and four small fuel and ammunition dumps, flying 842 sorties with the loss of 11 pilots. Whilst performing in a ground support role, Hurricanes based at RAF Castel Benito, Tripoli, knocked out six tanks, 13 armoured vehicles, 10 lorries, five half-tracks, a gun and trailer, and a wireless van on 10 March 1943, with no losses to themselves.

In the spring of 1943, during the German Ochsenkopf offensive in Tunisia, Hurricane IIDs conducted many sorties after fog had lifted, helping to blunt the final attack at Hunts Gap.

Defence of Malta
The Hurricane played a significant role in the defence of Malta. When Italy entered the war on 10 June 1940, Malta's air defence rested on Gloster Gladiators, which managed to hold out against vastly superior numbers of the Italian air force during the following 17 days. Initially there were six Gladiators, though after a while, only three were able to be flown at any one time because of a shortage of spare parts, and for whatever reason (five different explanations have been given), they became known as "Faith, Hope and Charity". Four Hurricanes joined them at the end of June, and together they faced attacks throughout July from the 200 enemy aircraft based in Sicily, with the loss of one Gladiator and one Hurricane. Further reinforcements arrived on 2 August in the form of 12 more Hurricanes and two Blackburn Skuas. 

The increasing number of British aircraft on the island, at last, prompted the Italians to employ German Junkers Ju 87 dive bombers to try to destroy the airfields. Finally, in an attempt to overcome the stiff resistance put up by these few aircraft, the Luftwaffe took up base on the Sicilian airfields, only to find that Malta was not an easy target. After numerous attacks on the island over the following months, and the arrival of an extra 23 Hurricanes at the end of April 1941, and a further delivery a month later, the Luftwaffe left Sicily for the Russian Front in June that year.

As Malta was situated on the increasingly important sea supply route for the North African campaign, the Luftwaffe returned with a vengeance for a second assault on the island at the beginning of 1942. It was not until March, when the onslaught was at its height, that 15 Spitfires flew in off the carrier  to bolster the defence, but many of the new aircraft were lost on the ground and  the Hurricane bore the brunt of the early fighting until further reinforcements arrived.

Air defence in the Soviet Union

The Hawker Hurricane was the first Allied Lend-Lease aircraft to be delivered to the Soviet Union with a total of 2,952 Hurricanes eventually delivered, becoming the most numerous British aircraft in Soviet service. Many Soviet pilots were disappointed by the Hawker fighter, regarding it as inferior to both German and Soviet aircraft.

During 1941, Mk.II Hurricanes played an important air defence role when the Soviet Union found itself under threat from the approaching German Army, who were advancing across a broad front stretching from Leningrad and Moscow to the oil fields in the south. Britain's decision to aid the Soviets meant sending supplies by sea to the far northern ports, and as the convoys needed to sail within range of enemy air attack from the Luftwaffe based in neighbouring Finland, it was decided to deliver a number of Hurricane Mk.IIBs, flying with Nos. 81 and 134 Squadrons of No. 151 Wing RAF, to provide protection. Twenty-four were transported on the carrier Argus, arriving just off Murmansk on 28 August 1941, and another 15 crated aircraft on board merchant vessels. In addition to their convoy protection duties, the aircraft also acted as escorts to Soviet bombers.
Enemy attention to the area declined in October, at which point the RAF pilots trained their Soviet counterparts to operate the Hurricanes themselves. By the end of the year, the RAF's direct role in the region had ended, but the aircraft themselves remained behind and became the first of thousands of Allied aircraft that were accepted by the Soviet Union. Although Soviet pilots were not universally enthusiastic about the Hurricane, twice Hero of the Soviet Union Lt. Col. Boris Safonov "loved the Hurricane", and RAF Hurricane Mk.IIB fighters operating from Soviet soil in defence of Murmansk, destroyed 15 Luftwaffe aircraft for only one loss in combat. However, in some Soviet war memoirs, the Hurricane has been described in very unflattering terms.

The "Soviet" IIB Hurricane as a multi-role fighter-bomber had quite a few drawbacks. First of all, it was  slower than its main opponent, the Bf 109E interceptor, at low and medium height, and had a slower rate of climb. The Messerschmitt could outdive the Hurricane because of the thicker wing profile of the British fighter. But the main source of complaints was the Hurricane's armament. On occasion, the eight or 12 rifle-calibre machine guns did not damage the sturdy and heavily armoured German aircraft; consequently, Soviet ground crews started to remove the Brownings. Retaining only four or six of the 12 machine guns, two  Berezin UBs or two or even four  ShVAK cannons were substituted, but overall performance deteriorated as a result.

The British archives file AIR 22/310 reports 218 Mk.IIA sent to the Soviet Union or handed over, 22 lost before arrival, 1,884 Mk.IIB sent or handed over, 278 lost before arrival, 1,182 Mk.IIC sent or handed over, 46 lost before arrival, 117 rejected, 60 IID sent or handed over, 14 rejected, 30 Mk.IV handed over, total 3,374 Hurricanes sent or handed over, 346 lost before delivery, 2,897 accepted by the Soviets, 131 rejected.

Far East

Following the outbreak of the war with Japan, 51 Hurricane Mk.IIBs en route to Iraq were diverted to Singapore; 10 were in crates, the others partially disassembled, these and the 24 pilots (many of whom were veterans of the Battle of Britain), who had been transferred to the theatre, formed the nucleus of five squadrons. They arrived on 13 January 1942, by which time the Allied fighter squadrons in Singapore, flying Brewster Buffalos, had been overwhelmed during the Malayan campaign. The fighters of the Imperial Japanese Army Air Force, especially the Nakajima Ki-43 Oscar, had been underestimated in its capability, numbers and the strategy of its commanders.

Thanks to the efforts of the 151st Maintenance Unit, the 51 Hurricanes were assembled and ready for testing within 48 hours and of these, 21 were ready for operational service within three days. The Hurricanes were fitted with bulky 'Vokes' dust filters under the nose and were armed with 12, rather than eight, machine guns. The additional weight and drag made them slow to climb and unwieldy to manoeuvre at altitude, although they were more effective bomber killers.

The recently arrived pilots were formed into 232 Squadron and 488 (NZ) Squadron, flying Buffaloes, converted to Hurricanes. On 18 January, the two squadrons formed the basis of 226 Group; 232 Squadron became operational on 22 January and suffered the first losses and victories for the Hurricane in Southeast Asia. Between 27 and 30 January, another 48 Hurricanes Mk.IIB arrived with the aircraft carrier , from which they flew to airfields code-named P1 and P2, near Palembang, Sumatra in the Netherlands East Indies.

Because of inadequate early warning systems (the first British radar stations became operational only towards the end of February), Japanese air raids were able to destroy 30 Hurricanes on the ground in Sumatra, most of them in one raid on 7 February. After Japanese landings in Singapore, on 10 February, the remnants of 232 and 488 Squadrons were withdrawn to Palembang. Japanese paratroopers began the invasion of Sumatra on 13 February. Hurricanes destroyed six Japanese transport ships on 14 February but lost seven aircraft in the process. On 18 February, the remaining Allied aircraft and aircrews moved to Java, with only 18 serviceable Hurricanes out of the original 99. That month, 12 Hurricane Mk.IIB Trops were supplied to the Dutch forces on Java. With dust filters removed and fuel and ammo load in wings halved, these were able to stay in a turn with the Oscars they fought. After Java was invaded, some of the New Zealand pilots were evacuated by sea to Australia.

When a Japanese carrier task force under the command of Admiral Chūichi Nagumo made a sortie into the Indian Ocean in April 1942, RAF Hurricanes based on Ceylon saw action against Nagumo's forces during attacks on Colombo on 5 April 1942 and on Trincomalee harbour on 9 April 1942.

On 5 April 1942, Captain Mitsuo Fuchida of the Imperial Japanese Navy, who led the attack on Pearl Harbor, led a strike against Colombo with 53 Nakajima B5N torpedo bombers and 38 Aichi D3A dive bombers, escorted by 36 Mitsubishi A6M Zero fighters. They were opposed by 35 Hurricane I and IIBs of 30 and 258 Squadrons, together with six Fairey Fulmars of 803 and 806 Naval Air Squadrons of the Fleet Air Arm. The Hurricanes mainly tried to shoot down the attacking bombers, but were engaged heavily by the escorting Zeros. A total of 21 Hurricanes were shot down (although two of these were repairable), together with four Fulmars and six Swordfish of 788 Naval Air Squadron that had been surprised in flight by the raid. The RAF claimed 18 Japanese aircraft destroyed, seven probably destroyed and nine damaged, with one aircraft claimed by a Fulmar and five by anti-aircraft fire. This compared with actual Japanese losses of one Zero and six D3As, with a further seven D3As, five B5Ns and three Zeros damaged.

On 9 April 1942, the Japanese task force sent 91 B5Ns escorted by 41 Zeros against Trincomalee port and the nearby China Bay airfield. Sixteen Hurricanes opposed the raid, of which eight were lost with a further three damaged. They claimed eight Japanese aircraft destroyed with a further four probably destroyed and at least five damaged. Actual Japanese losses were three A6Ms and two B5Ns, with a further 10 B5Ns damaged.

The battles over the Arakan in 1943 represented the last large-scale use of the Hurricane as a pure day fighter. But they were still used in the fighter-bomber role in Burma until the end of the war and they were occasionally caught up in air combat as well. For example, on 15 February 1944, Flg Off Jagadish Chandra Verma of No. 6 Squadron of the Royal Indian Air Force shot down a Japanese Ki-43 Oscar: it was the only RIAF victory of the war. The Hurricane remained in service as a fighter-bomber over the Balkans and at home as well where it was used mainly for second-line tasks and occasionally flown by ace pilots. For example, in mid-1944, ace Squadron Leader "Jas" Storrar flew No 1687 Hurricane to deliver priority mail to Allied armies in France during the Normandy invasion.

Aircraft carrier operations

During the next three years, Fleet Air Arm Sea Hurricanes were to feature prominently while operating from Royal Navy aircraft carriers. The Sea Hurricane scored an impressive kill-to-loss ratio, primarily while defending Malta convoys, and operating from escort carriers in the Atlantic Ocean. For example, on 26 May 1944, Royal Navy Sea Hurricanes operating from the escort carrier HMS Nairana claimed the destruction of three Ju 290 reconnaissance aircraft during the defence of a convoy.

Finland

During the Winter War, Finnish Air Force were in dire need of modern fighters and sourced them from several countries, including the United Kingdom. Finland bought 12 Hurricanes and the delivery commenced on 2 February 1940. The Hurricanes were flown from St Athan, Wales to Västerås, Sweden, via Scotland and Norway by Finnish pilots in two batches. The first batch arrived in Västerås on 29 February, with the last aircraft arriving on 10 March. During the second batch flight, two Hurricanes were lost, with one crashing in Norway and the other being damaged during landing in Scotland and left there. The Hurricanes were initially deployed to LLv 22. Later they were transferred to LLv 28 and finally moved to LLv 30. During the period of Interim Peace, two further Hurricanes were lost in accidents.

At the start of the Continuation War on 25 June 1941, the Hurricanes were allocated to LLv 30. On 2 July 1941, a Hurricane were mistakenly shot down by friendly anti-aircraft at Vainikkala. The Finnish Hurricanes' first combat came on 3 July, when three Hurricanes encountered several Soviet fighters and shot down an I-153 "Chaika". In the next day, the Hurricane shot down a Tupolev SB bomber. Another encounters with Soviet fighter took place on 15 July above the Karelian Isthmus, with two I-153 claimed as being shot down. The last aircraft shot down by Finnish Hurricanes was an I-15 on 6 January 1942.

Hurricane aces
Top scoring Hurricane pilots:
 Squadron Leader Marmaduke "Pat" Pattle, with 35 Hawker fighter victories (out of career 50 total, with two shared) serving with No. 80 and 33 Squadrons. All of his Hurricane kills were achieved over Greece in 1941. He was shot down and killed in the Battle of Athens on April 20, 1941.
 Wing Commander Frank Reginald Carey claimed 28 air victories while flying Hurricanes during 1939–43,
 Squadron Leader William "Cherry" Vale totalled 20 kills (of 30) in Greece and Syria with No. 80 Squadron.
 Czech pilot Flight Lieutenant Karel Kuttelwascher achieved all of his 18 air victories with the Hurricane, most as an intruder night fighter with No. 1 Squadron.
 Pilot Officer V.C. Woodward (33 and 213 Squadrons) was another top-scoring ace with 14 (out of 18 total, three of which are shared)
 Flying Officer Willie McKnight scored at least 17 victories in Hurricanes.
 Flight Lieutenant Richard P. Stevens claimed all of his 14.5 enemy aircraft flying the Hurricane.
 Richard "Dickie" Cork was the leading Fleet Air Arm Sea Hurricane ace, with nine destroyed, two shared, one probable, four damaged and seven destroyed on the ground.
 Czech pilot Josef František, flying with 303 Polish Squadron, shot down at least 17 enemy aircraft over southeast England during September–October 1940.
 Polish pilot Witold Urbanowicz, flying with 303 Polish Squadron, had 15 confirmed kills and one probable during the Battle of Britain.
 Wing Commander Ian Gleed claimed most of his 13 victories while flying Hurricanes with No. 87 Squadron RAF from the Battle of France through the end of 1941.
 Wing Commander Mark Henry Brown scored 18 victories with No. 1 Squadron. He was the first Canadian ace of the Second World War and was killed on a strafing mission in Sicily in November 1941.
 Marshal of the Air Force Arjan Singh DFC, was a British Indian fighter pilot who was awarded the Distinguished Flying Cross for his flying during the Burma campaign. He went on to become the Chief of Air staff of the Indian Air Force and was given the honorary rank of Marshal of the Air Force for his leadership during the Indo-Pakistan war of 1965.

Pilot of Note
 2nd Officer Winifred Crossley Fair. ATA Pilot. First female to fly a Hawker Hurricane.

Variants

Hurricane Mk.I
First production version, with fabric-covered wings, a wooden two-bladed, fixed-pitch propeller (first 435) or three blade two -pitch propeller, powered by the  Rolls-Royce Merlin Mk.II (first 364) or III engines and armed with eight  Browning machine guns. Produced between 1937 and 1939.

Hurricane Mk.I (revised)
A revised Hurricane Mk.I series built with a de Havilland or Rotol constant speed metal propeller (from mid 1940), metal-covered wings, armour and other improvements. A total of 4,200 Mk.Is were built; 1,924 by Hawker, 1,850 by Gloster Aircraft Company and 426 by Canadian Car and Foundry between December 1937 and July 1941. The Canadian Car and Foundry Hurricanes were shipped to England to be fitted with engines.

Hurricane Mk.IIA Series 1
Hurricane Mk.I powered by the improved Merlin XX engine with two-speed supercharger. This new engine used a coolant mix of 30% glycol and 70% water. Pure glycol is flammable, so not only was the new mix safer, but the engine also ran approximately  cooler, which gave longer engine life and greater reliability. The new engine was longer than the earlier Merlin and so the Hurricane gained a 4.5 in "plug" in front of the cockpit, which made the aircraft slightly more stable due to the slight forward shift in centre of gravity. First flew on 11 June 1940 and went into squadron service in September 1940. Hawker built 418 and Gloster Aircraft Company 33.

Hurricane Mk.IIB (Hurricane IIA Series 2)
A few were fitted with racks allowing them to carry two  or two  bombs. The same racks allowed the Hurricane to carry two  drop tanks instead of the bombs, nearly doubling the Hurricane's fuel load.

Hurricane Mk.IIA Series 2 was equipped with a new and slightly longer propeller spinner, and four additional wing-mounted  Browning machine guns; for a total of 12 guns. The first aircraft were built in February 1941 and were renamed Mk.IIB in April 1941. A total of 3,050 IIBs built to November 1942, 1,883 by Hawker, 867 by Gloster Aircraft Company and 300 by the Austin Aero Company.

Hurricane Mk.IIB Trop.
For use in North Africa the Hawker Hurricane Mk.IIB (and other variants) were tropicalised. They were fitted with Vokes and Rolls-Royce engine dust filters and the pilots were issued with a desert survival kit, including a bottle of water behind the cockpit.

Hurricane Mk.IIC (Hurricane Mk.IIA Series 2)
Hurricane Mk.IIA Series 1 equipped with new and slightly longer propeller spinner, and fully replaced the machine-gun armament with four  Hispano Mk.II cannons, two per side. Hurricane IIA Series 2 became the Mk.IIC in June 1941, using a slightly modified wing. The new wings also included a hardpoint for a  bomb and, later in 1941, fuel tanks. By then performance was inferior to the latest German fighters, and the Hurricane changed to the ground-attack role, sometimes referred to as the Hurribomber. The Mk.also served as a night fighter and intruder with about three quarters converted to fighter bombers. There were 4,711 IIcs built by Hawker between February 1941 and July 1944.

Hurricane Mk.IID
Armed with two  anti-tank autocannon in a gondola-style pod, one under each wing and a single Browning machine gun in each wing loaded with tracers for aiming purposes. The first aircraft flew on 18 September 1941 and deliveries started in 1942. Serial-built aircraft had additional armour for the pilot, radiator and engine, and were armed with a Rolls-Royce gun with 12 rounds, later changed to the  Vickers S gun with 15 rounds. The weight of guns and armour protection marginally impaired the aircraft's performance. These Hurricanes were nicknamed "Flying Can Openers", perhaps a play on the logo of No. 6 Squadron, which flew the Hurricane starting in 1942. A total of 296 built by Hawker from January 1942 to February 1943.

Hurricane Mk.IIE
This designation was used by the Ministry of Aircraft Production in 1942 and 1943 for Mk.II factory fitted with wing racks, 270 delivered according to the Ministry, the RAF used the IIB or C designations. The Mk.IIE was not an early Mk.IV.

Hurricane Mk.T.IIC

Two-seat training version of the Mk. IIC. Only two aircraft were built, for the Imperial Iranian Air Force.

Hurricane Mk.III
Version of the Hurricane Mk.II powered by a US Packard-built Merlin engine, intending to enable supplies of the British-built engines for other designs. By the time production was to have started, British Merlin production had increased to the point where the idea was abandoned.

Hurricane Mk.IV
The last major change to the Hurricane was the introduction of the "universal Wing", a single design able to mount two  bombs,or  two  Vickers S guns, or two 40 mm (1.57 in) Rolls-Royce B.H. type guns, two SBC (small bomb containers) or SCI (smoke curtain installation),or two 45 or 90 gallon drop tanks or eight "60 pounder" RP-3 rockets. Two  Brownings were fitted to aid aiming of the heavier armament. Despite persistent reports actually fitted with the same Merlin XX as the Mk.II. All Merlin 27s were modified to Merlin 25 and used in Mosquitoes, there were only 16 production Merlin 24s by the time over 300 Mk.IV had been delivered. The individual aircraft cards held by the RAF museum reports the final Mk.IV had a Merlin XX. The radiator was deeper and armoured. Additional armour was also fitted around the engine. 524 built by Hawker between December 1942 and March 1944.

Hurricane Mk.V
The final variant to be produced. Only one was built and two Mk.IV converted, and the variant never reached production. This was planned to be powered by a Merlin 27 but also tested with a Merlin 32 boosted engine to give  at low level and was intended as a dedicated ground-attack aircraft to use in Burma. All three prototypes had four-bladed propellers.

Hurricane Mk.X
Canadian-built variant. Canadian Car and Foundry report building a total of 915 Mk.II airframes for Holland (one), the RAF (514) and RCAF (400), between November 1941 and May 1943. The Mk.X designation has been used by the RAF for Canadian Car and Foundry built Mk.I, but it is usually defined as Mk.II airframes fitted with a Merlin 28. About two thirds of the Canadian Car and Foundry built Mk.II airframes shipped to Britain did so without an engine, the remainder being fitted with Merlin 28s in Canada, but the engine was near automatically removed upon arrival and a Merlin XX fitted instead. The aircraft was called a Mk.II by the RAF. Apart from some test flights in Canada and England no Hurricane flew powered by a Merlin 28. Canada only imported 285 Merlin 28 for Hurricanes, all of which were shipped to Britain either as a separate engine or attached to a Hurricane.

Hurricane Mk.XI
Canadian-built variant. Not an official Mk. number. Designation used by many references for 150 aircraft from the RCAF Mk.XII order sent to Britain, these aircraft had their Merlin 29 removed and were either shipped without an engine or fitted with a Merlin 28. Fitted with Merlin XX on arrival in Britain and called a Mk.II by the RAF.

Hurricane Mk.XII
Canadian-built variant. Originally designated the Mk.IIB (Can), designation changed to Mk.XII in April 1943. Single-seat fighter and fighter-bomber. An order for 400 Mk.II airframes for the RCAF powered by a  Packard Merlin 29, armed with twelve  machine guns, production starting in June 1942. 150 sent to Britain in 1943 either engineless or fitted with a Merlin 28.

Hurricane Mk.XIIA
Canadian-built variant. The survivors of a batch of 30 RAF order Mk.I airframes retained in Canada in late 1941, initially fitted with Merlin III and propellers from Fairey Battles, when fitted with Merlin 29. Armed with eight  machine guns

Holland standard Hurricane
Canadian built variant. RAF serial airframe AM270 was completed around early March 1942 to Dutch standards, including US built Merlin, instruments and gun sight, as the prototype of an order for the Netherlands East Indies (KM/KNIL). Given the Dutch serial HC3-287, its subsequent fate is unclear beyond being used by Canadian Car and Foundry for test flying. AM270 was also used by the RAF for a Consolidated San Diego built Catalina, creating a further level of confusion. On 19 August 1941, the Canadian government placed an order with Canadian Car and Foundry for 400 Hurricanes, with 100 meant for the Netherlands and 300 for China, the Netherlands order was amended to 72, the Chinese decided to buy American, which resulted in 328 being offered to the USSR, to be shipped across the Pacific. In the end 250 served with the RCAF as Mk.XIIs and 150 were sent to Britain as Mk.IIs.

Sea Hurricane Mk.IA
The Sea Hurricane Mk.IA was a Hurricane Mk.I modified by General Aircraft Limited. These conversions numbered approximately 250 aircraft. They were modified to be carried by CAM ships (catapult-armed merchantman), whose ships' crews were Merchant Marine and whose Hurricanes were crewed and serviced by RAF personnel, or Fighter Catapult Ships, which were Naval Auxiliary Vessels crewed by naval personnel and aircraft operated by the Fleet Air Arm. These ships were equipped with a catapult for launching an aircraft, but without facilities to recover them. Consequently, if the aircraft were not in range of a land base, pilots had to bail out or to ditch.
Both of these options had their problems—there was always a chance of striking part of the fuselage when bailing out, and a number of pilots had been killed in this way. Ditching the Hurricane in the sea called for skill as the radiator housing acted as a water brake, pitching the nose of the fighter downwards when it hit the water, while also acting as a very efficient scoop, helping to flood the Hurricane so that a quick exit was necessary before the aircraft sank. Then the pilot had to be picked up by a ship. More than 80 modifications were needed to convert a Hurricane into a Sea Hurricane, including new radios to conform with those used by the Fleet Air Arm and new instrumentation to read in knots rather than miles per hour. They were informally known as "Hurricats".
The majority of the aircraft modified had suffered wear-and-tear serving with front line squadrons, so much so that at least one example used during trials broke up under the stress of a catapult launching. CAM Sea Hurricanes were launched operationally on eight occasions and the Hurricanes shot down six enemy aircraft for the loss of one Hurricane pilot killed. The first Sea Hurricane Mk.IA kill was an Fw 200C Condor, shot down on 2 August 1941.

Sea Hurricane Mk.IB
Hurricane Mk.I version equipped with catapult spools plus an arrester hook. A total of 340 aircraft were converted. The first Sea Hurricane Mk.IB kill occurred on 31 July 1941 when Sea Hurricanes of 880 squadron FAA operating from HMS Furious shot down a Do 18 flying-boat.

Apart from the conversions in Britain 50 Sea Hurricane Mk.IB were built in Canada and delivered in late 1941 and early 1942. Initially fitted with a Merlin III, they became Mk.XIIA when later fitted with a Merlin 29.

Sea Hurricane Mk.IC
Reported to be a Hurricane Mk.I version equipped with catapult spools, an arrester hook and the four-cannon wing. Despite persistent reports of hundreds converted from early 1942 only two test examples actually done.

Lt. R. J. Cork was credited with five kills while flying a Sea Hurricane I during Operation Pedestal.

Sea Hurricane Mk.IIC
60 built by Hawker between November 1942 and May 1943, version equipped with naval radio gear; other standard Mk.IICs were converted and used on fleet carriers.

Note the RAF reports as of end June 1944 a total of 378 conversions to Sea Hurricane I, less any conversions back to standard Hurricanes, and no conversions to Sea Hurricane II.

Sea Hurricane Mk.XII
50 Canadian built Sea Hurricane I delivered in late 1941 and early 1942. Initially fitted with Merlin III as Mk.I, the survivors became Mk.XII when fitted with Merlin 29.

Hillson F.40 (a.k.a. F.H.40)
A full-scale version of the Hills & Son Bi-mono slip-wing biplane/monoplane, using a Hawker Hurricane Mk.I returned from Canada as RCAF ser no 321 (RAF serial L1884). Taxi and flight trials carried out at RAF Sealand during May 1943, and at the Aeroplane and Armament Experimental Establishment, Boscombe Down from September 1943. The upper wing was not released in flight before the programme was terminated due to poor performance.

Hurricane Photo Reconnaissance
The Service Depot at Heliopolis in Egypt converted several Hurricanes Is for photo reconnaissance. The first three were converted in January 1941. Two carried a pair of F24 cameras with 8-inch focal length lenses. The third carried one vertical and two oblique F24s with 14-inch focal length lenses mounted in the rear fuselage, close to the trailing edge of the wing, and a fairing was built up over the lenses aft of the radiator housing. A further five Hurricanes were modified in March 1941, and two were converted in a similar manner in Malta during April 1941. During October 1941 a batch of six Hurricane Mk.IIs were converted to PR Mk.II status and a final batch, thought to be of 12 aircraft, was converted in late 1941.

Hurricane Tac R
For duties closer to the front lines some Hurricanes were converted to Tactical Reconnaissance (Tac R) aircraft. An additional radio was fitted for liaison with ground forces who were better placed to direct the Hurricane. Some Hurricane Tac R aircraft also had a vertical camera fitted in the rear fuselage, so to compensate for the extra weight either one or two Brownings or two cannon would be omitted. Externally these aircraft were only distinguishable by the missing armament.

Operators

Due to its lightweight, yet robust, construction and ease of maintenance, the Hurricane had a long operational life in many theatres of war. It was also built by, or exported to, several other countries. The Hurricane was unusual in that it was flown operationally by both the Allies and the Axis during the war. In some cases (e.g., Portugal and Ireland) the Hurricane was pressed into service after being forced to land in a neutral country.

In 1939 Latvia ordered and paid for 30 Hurricane fighters, but due to the start of the Second World War later that year, the aircraft were never delivered.

Surviving aircraft

Of more than 14,583 Hurricanes that were built, approximately 16 (including three Sea Hurricanes) are in airworthy condition worldwide, although many other non-flying examples survive in various air museums.

Specifications (Hurricane Mk.IIC)

See also

References

Notes

Citations

Bibliography
 
 Bader, Douglas. Fight for the Sky: The Story of the Spitfire and Hurricane. London: Cassell Military Books, 2004. .
 Barker, Ralph. The Hurricats: The Fighters That could not Return. Stroud, Gloucestershire: Tempus Publishing, 2000. .
 Beamont, Roland. "Hurricane Baptism." Aeroplane Monthly magazine, Volume 22, No. 1, Issue 249, January 1994. London: IPC Magazines Limited.
 Beamont, Roland. "Hurricane Testing." Aeroplane Monthly magazine, Volume 22, No. 2, Issue 250, February 1994. London: IPC Magazines Limited.
 Bignozzi, Giorgio. Aerei d'Italia(in Italian). Milan: Milano Edizioni E.C.A., 2000.
 Bishop, Edward. Hurricane. Shrewsbury: Airlife Publishing, 1986. .
 Boer, P.C.. The Loss of Java. NUS Press, 2011. . And earlier Dutch version Het Verlies van Java. De Bataafsche Leeuw, 2006. .
 Bowyer, Chaz. Hurricane at War. London: Ian Allan Ltd., 1974. .
 Boyne, Walter J. Scontro di Ali — L'aviazione militare nella Seconda Guerra Mondiale (in Italian). Milan: Mursia, 1997. .
 Breffort, Dominique. Hawker Hurricane — de 1935 à 1945 (Avions et Pilotes 14) (in French). Paris: Histoire et Collections, 2010. .
 Bridgman, Leonard, ed. "The Hawker Hurricane". Jane's Fighting Aircraft of World War II. London: Studio, 1946. .
 Brodie, Ian. Hurricane Mk.IIA: The Alpine Fighter Collection. Auckland, New Zealand: Reed Books, 2000. .
 Brown, Eric, CBE, DCS, AFC, RN.; William Green and Gordon Swanborough. Wings of the Navy, Flying Allied Carrier Aircraft of World War Two. London: Jane's Publishing Company, 1980. .
 Bungay, Stephen. The Most Dangerous Enemy. London: Aurum Press, 2000. .
 Burns, Michael G. Cobber Kain. Auckland, New Zealand: Random Century, 1992. .
 
 Cacutt, Len, ed. "Hawker Hurricane." Great Aircraft of the World. London: Marshall Cavendish, 1989. .
 Chorlton, Martyn. Hawker Hurricane MK I-V(Air Vanguard; 6). Oxford: Osprey Publishing, 2013. .
 Cull, Brian and Frederick Galea. Gladiators over Malta: The Story of Faith, Hope and Charity. Rabat, Malta: Wise Owl Publications, 2008. .
 Cull, Brian and Brian and Paul Sortehaug. Hurricanes Over Singapore: RAF, RNZAF and Nei Fighters in Action Against the Japanese Over the Island and the Netherlands East Indies, 1942 . London: Grub Street, 2004. .
 Donald, David. The Military Propeller Aircraft Guide. London: Chartwell Books, Inc., 1999. .
 Deighton, Len. Fighter: The True Story of the Battle of Britain. New York: Ballantine Books, 1977. .
 De Marchi, Italo. Fiat CR.42 Falco. Modena: Stem Mucchi Editore, 1994.
 De Marchi, Italo. Macchi MC. 200 "Saetta". Modena: Stem Mucchi Editore, 1994.
 Dibbs, John and Tony Holmes. Hurricane: A Fighter Legend. Oxford, UK: Osprey, 1995. .
 Drabkin, Artem. The Red Air Force at War: Barbarossa and the Retreat to Moscow – Recollections of Fighter Pilots on the Eastern Front. Barnsley, South Yorkshire, UK: Pen & Sword Military, 2007. .
 Ellis, Ken. "Back to the Biplane: The 'Slip-wing' and the Hurricane". Air Enthusiast No. 107, September/October 2003. pp. 47–51. 
 Fozard, John W., ed. Sydney Camm and the Hurricane: Perspectives on the Master Fighter Designer and his Finest Achievement. London: Airlife, 1991. .
 Glancey, Jonathan. Spitfire: The Illustrated Biography. London: Atlantic Books, 2006. .
 Gleed, Ian. Arise to Conquer. New York: Random House, 1942.
 Golley, John. "Hurricanes over Murmansk". Shrewsbury: Airlife Publishing, 2001. 
 Gordon, Yefim. Soviet Air Power in World War 2. Hinkley, UK: Midland /Allan Publishing, 2008. .
 Goulding, James. Camouflage and Markings, RAF Fighter Command Northern Europe 1936–1945 London: Ducimus Books Ltd/Doubleday & Co, 1971. .
 Green, William. "Hawker Hurricane." Famous Fighters of the Second World War. London: MacDonald, 1957.
 Gunston, Bill. Aerei della 2a Guerra Mondiale (in Italian). Milan: Alberto Peruzzo editore, 1984. NO ISBN.
 Haining, Peter. The Chianti Raiders. London: Robson Books, 2006. .
 "Half-Century Hurricane": Part Four. Air International, July 1987, Vol. 33, No. 1, pp. 26–35, 49. ISSN 0306-5634.
 Harvey-Bailey, A. The Merlin in Perspective: The Combat Years. Derby, UK: Rolls-Royce Heritage Trust, 1995 (4th edition). .
 Hiscock, Melvyn. Hawker Hurricane Inside and Out. Ramsbury, Marlborough, UK: The Crowood Press, 2003. .
 Holmes, Tom. Hurricanes to the Fore: The First Aces (Aircraft of the Aces: Men and Legends Ser.# 7). Oxford, UK: Osprey Publishing, 1999. .
 
 Jackson, Robert. The Forgotten Aces. London: Sphere Books Ltd., 1989. .
 Jacobs, Peter. Hawker Hurricane. Ramsbury, Marlborough, UK: Crowood Press, 1998. .
 Jarrett, Philip. "Nothing Ventured...:Part Ten". Aeroplane Monthly, January 1991, Vol 19 No 1. ISSN 0143-7240. pp. 18–23.
 Keskinen, Kalevi and Kari Stenman. Hurricane & Gladiator (Suomen Ilmavoimien Historia 25) (bilingual Finnish/English). Espoo, Finland: Kari Stenman, 2005. .
 
 
 
 Lowe, Malcolm V. and Paul Blackah. Hawker Hurricane: Owners' Workshop Manual. Sparkford, Yeovil, UK: Haynes Publishing, 2010. .
 Malizia, Nicola. Aermacchi Bagliori di guerra – Flashes of War (Macchi MC.200- MC.202 – MC.205/V) (in Italian). Rome: Ibn Editore, 2002. .
 Marchant, David J. Rise from the East: The Story of 247 (China British) Squadron Royal Air Force. Tonbridge, Kent, UK: Air Britain (Historians) Ltd., 1996. .
 Mason, Francis K. The British Fighter Since 1912. London: Putnam, 1992. .
 Mason, Francis K. Hawker Aircraft Since 1920 (3rd revised edition). London: Putnam, 1991. .
 Mason, Francis K. The Hawker Hurricane (Macdonald Aircraft Monographs). London: Macdonald, 1962.
 Mason, Francis K. The Hawker Hurricane [Rev. Edition]. Manchester, UK: Crécy Publishing, 2001. .
 
 
 Matricardi, Paolo. Aerei militari: Caccia e ricognitori — Volume 1. Milan: Mondadori Electa, 2006. No ISBN.
 McKinstry, Leo. Hurricane: Victor of the Battle of Britain. London: John Murray, 2010. .
 Morgan, Hugh. Gli assi Sovietici della Seconda guerra mondiale(in Italian). Milan: Edizioni del Prado/Osprey Aviation, 1999. .
 
 Neulen, Hans Werner. In the Skies of Europe. Ramsbury, UK: The Crowood Press, 2006. .
 
 Pacco, John. "Hawker Hurricane Mk.I" Belgisch Leger/Armee Belge: Het Militair Vliegwezen/l'Aeronautique Militare 1930–1940 (bilingual French/Dutch). Aartselaar, Belgium: J.P. Publications, 2003, pp. 60–65. .
 Postan, Michael M. British War Production London: HMSO, 1952.
 Prins, François. Second to None: Homage to the Hawker Hurricane. Air Enthusiast 87, May–June 2000, pp. 26–40. 
 Ramsay, Winston, ed. The Battle of Britain Then and Now, Mark V. London: After the Battle Magazine, 1989. .
 
 Rybin, Yuriy. Soviet Hurricane Aces of World War 2 (Osprey Aircraft of the Aces; 107). Oxford: Osprey Publishing, 2012. 
 Ryś, Marek. Hawker Hurricane. Redbourn, Herts, UK: Mushroom Model Publications, 2006. .
 Sarkar, Dilip (Ed.). "Hurricane Manual 1940". Stroud (UK): Amberley, 2013. .
 Schlaifer, Robert "Development of Aircraft Engines". Andover: The Andover Press, LTD, 1950. .
 Sgarlato, Nico. Fiat CR.42 (in Italian). Parma, Italy: Delta Editrice, 2005.
 Shacklady, Edward. Hawker Hurricane (Classic WWII Aviation). London: Tempus Publishing, Limited, 2000. .
 Shores, Christopher. Bloody Shambles, The First Comprehensive Account of the Air Operations over South-East Asia December 1941 – April 1942. Volume One: Drift to War to the Fall of Singapore. London: Grub Street Press, 1992. 
 Shores, Christopher, Brian Cull and Yasuho Izawa.Bloody Shambles: Volume Two: The Defence of Sumatra to the Fall of Burma. London: Grub Street, 1993. .
 Shores, Christopher, Brian Cull and Nicola Malizia. Malta: The Hurricane Years. London: Grub Street, 1987. .
 Simmons, Graham. Fighters Under Construction in World War Two. Barnsley, South Yorkshire; Pen & Sword Aviation, 2013. 
 Snedden, Robert. World War II Combat Aircraft. Bristol, UK: Factfinders Parragon, 1997. .
 Stenman, Kari and Andrew Thomas.  Brewster F2A Buffalo Aces of World War 2. Oxford, UK: Osprey Publishing, 2010. .
 Thetford, Owen. British Naval Aircraft Since 1912. London: Putnam Aeronautical Books, 1994. .
 Thomas, Andrew. Hurricane Aces 1941–45. Aircraft of the Aces. Oxford, UK: Osprey Publishing, 2003. .
 Thomas, Andrew. "India's Night Guardians". Aviation News, 30 October–12 November 1996.
 Thomas, Andrew. Royal Navy Aces of World War 2. Aircraft of the Aces. Oxford, UK: Osprey, 2007. .
 Vaccari, Pier Francesco. "Indian Ocean Raid." Historic Revue. Modena: Coop Giornalisti Storici, August 1995.
 Wawrzyński, Mirosław. Hurricane w obcej służbie — Hurricane in Foreign Service. Książki Militarne. Warsaw, Poland: AJaKS, 2001. .
 Weal, John. Bf 109D/E Aces 1939/41. Aircraft of the Aces. Oxford, UK: Osprey Publishing, 1996 (Edizioni Del Prado, 1999). .
 Yefim, Gordon. Soviet Air Power in World War 2. Midland Publishing, 2008

External links

 WW2 aircraft performance and combat reports
 Hurricane operational characteristics – Report by Sqn Ldr Gillan, 1938
 A Hurricane pilot talks about the plane and compares it to flying a Spitfire. Video Interview

 
Hurricane
1930s British fighter aircraft
Single-engined tractor aircraft
Low-wing aircraft
Carrier-based aircraft
Aircraft first flown in 1935
Retractable conventional landing gear
World War II aircraft of Finland